Khosrow Soltan Armani, known as Khosrow Khan (died 1653), Safavid official, military commander, and gholam of Armenian origin
 Khosrow Khan Gorji (1785–1857), eunuch of Armenian origin

See also
 Khosrow Khani (disambiguation)